Last Action Hero is a pinball machine designed by Joe Kaminkow and produced by Data East Pinball.  It is based on the motion picture of the same name.

Description
Instead of a typical plunger, the game features an auto plunger shaped like a Ruger Blackhawk .45 caliber pistol that launches the ball into play.  The pinball machine features a shaker motor, two captive balls and a crane toy that can pick up the ball and deliver it to another part of the playfield. The game also includes three magnets under the playfield which sends the ball in different directions; similar to The Addams Family.

Digital version
Last Action Hero is available as a licensed table of both The Pinball Arcade and its spin-off Stern Pinball Arcade for several platforms. Data East logos were removed because of licensing. Also, for the same reason, main play theme was edited.

References

External links

Pinball Archive rule sheet
 (Arnon Milchan version)

Pinball machines based on films
Data East pinball machines
1993 pinball machines